Bishop Emeritus John S. Sadananda (born September 24, 1949) was the Master of Senate of Serampore College (University), the nation's first  University {a University under Section 2 (f) of the University Grants Commission Act, 1956}) with degree-granting authority validated by a Danish Charter and ratified by the Government of West Bengal.

Sadananda was appointed as the Master of the University in 2010.  As an academic, Sadananda had been a Senator of the University from 1993 onwards since the time he was appointed as Principal of the Karnataka Theological College which has been an affiliated institution of the University. From 2006 to 2011, Sadananda had been President of the University.

In ecclesiastical matters, Sadananda was the fifth Bishop in Karnataka Southern Diocese of the Church of South India occupying the Cathedra placed in CSI-Shanthi Cathedral, Mangalore from 2009 to 2013.

Studies

Licentiate
Sadananda underwent ministerial formation as a candidate of the Basel Evangelical Mission at the Karnataka Theological College, Mangalore, affiliated to the nation's first University in 1965, the very year of the formation of the institution under the Principalship of Robert Scheuermeier taking a Licentiate in Theology in 1968 awarded by the Senate of Serampore College (University) led by its Registrar, C. Devasahayam. After a one-year ministerial period, he was ordained as a Deacon in 1969 by which time the Basel Evangelical Mission unionized itself into the Church of South India due to which Sadananda became a Deacon of the Church of South India under which he continued his ministry in the Diocese.

Graduate
In order to upgrade his academics, Sadananda joined the United Theological College, Bangalore in 1972 where he studied up to 1974 taking a Bachelor of Divinity under the Principalship of Joshua Russell Chandran.  During his two-year period at the Seminary in Bangalore, although a graduate student, Sadananda evinced keen interest in the Sacred Scriptures and the ancient Biblical languages which caught the attention of the Old Testament Scholar, E. C. John as well as the postgraduate students specialising in Old Testament, G. Solomon, A. P. Chacko, Basil Rebera, G. Babu Rao, Nitoy Achümi, S. J. Theodore, and Timotheas Hembrom. As part of the University requirements, Sadananda wrote his graduate thesis drawing parallels between the Book of Proverbs and the proverbial collections in Kannada which the Old Testament Teacher G. Babu Rao highlighted in one of his works.

Sadananda's graduate companions included Sydney Salins, Christopher Asir, P. Surya Prakash, D. Dhanaraj and others.  During the final year of his study in Bangalore, the Old Testament Scholar, Gerhard Wehmeier joined the College enriching the interest in Old Testament studies and Sadananda submitted a thesis entitled A Comparative Study of the Form and Content of the Book of Proverbs and of Sarvajna Vachanagalu done under the supervision of the Old Testament Scholar G. M. Butterworth.  The University awarded a degree at its Convocation held on February 1, 1975 at the Serampore College, Serampore where incidentally the Commemoration Mass was conducted by G. Babu Rao of Serampore College at the CNI-St. Olave's Church, Serampore.

Postgraduate
Sadananda also pursued a postgraduate degree from the University of Mysore taking a Master of Arts in Kannada.

Research studies
Sadananda enrolled at the Goethe Institute, Pune during 1977/1978 for language proficiency courses in German after which he proceeded to Germany in 1978 for an integral course leading to Doctor of Theology specializing in Old Testament with his B.D. degree from the Senate of Serampore College (University) which is considered by the German universities for entry into doctoral programmes.  Sadananda researched for 5 years at the University under Professors Hans-Joachim Kraus and R. Smend.  In 1983, Sadananda was able to complete his doctoral dissertation entitled Revelation in the Psalms and submitted it to the University which awarded a Doctor of Theology degree  which was later published by the University of Göttingen in October 1983.

During Sadananda's study period in Germany (1978–1983), he was joined by his senior from his seminary days in Bangalore, J. W. Gladstone who enrolled at the University of Hamburg in 1978 for pursuing doctoral studies in Church History.  A year later, they were joined by D. Dhanaraj, who happened to be Sadananda's graduate companion, who enrolled at the University of Hamburg in 1979 to pursue doctoral studies in Old Testament.  Two year's later in 1982, they were joined by G. Babu Rao, their postgraduate companion during their seminary days' in Bangalore, who came for a 2½ year study period to the University of Hamburg.  While Gladstone, Dhanaraj and Babu Rao were in Hamburg in the northern part of Germany, Sadananda was at Göttingen in the central part but was able to meet G. Babu Rao during the biannual Kirchentag that took place at Hannover in 1983.

Ecclesiastical career

Pastoral ministry
From 1968 to 1970, Sadananda pastored parishes of the erstwhile Basel Evangelical Mission which already joined the newly trifurcated Diocese of Mysore.  Due to the ecclesiastical jurisdiction, Sadananda was allotted the Karnataka Southern Diocese led by its Bishop S. R. Furtado. Again from 1974 to 1978, he pastored CSI-St. Paul’s Church, Mangalore.

Teaching ministry

Ever since Sadananda's completion of graduate studies at the Protestant Regional Seminary in Bangalore in 1974, he began teaching at the Protestant Seminary in Mangalore led by Principal C. D. Jathanna both of whom taught Old Testament for successive batches of students undergoing ministerial formation at the Seminary.  After a period of study leave (1978-1983), Sadananda returned to Mangalore and taught along with D. Dhanaraj.  While this was so, Sadananda's postgraduate companion, G. Babu Rao, first taught Old Testament at Serampore College, Serampore and later moved to the Protestant Regional Theologiate in Hyderabad while J. W. Gladstone, his senior, taught Church History at the Kerala United Theological Seminary in Trivandrum.

In 1992, Sadananda was made Principal of the College and led the Protestant Seminary in a responsible manner and represented it at the Senate of Serampore College (University) as an Invitee on ex officio basis.  In 2009, after teaching for nearly 35 years (1974–2009), Sadananda gave up his teaching and administrative responsibilities at the seminary as he was elected to the bishopric.

Bishopric
In 2009, the Church of South India Synod declared Sadananda as the fifth Bishop-elect leading to Sadananda's consecration at the CSI-Shanthi Cathedral on August 28, 2009 in Mangalore by the Principal Consecrator, J. W. Gladstone, Moderator and Christopher Asir, Deputy Moderator of the Church of South India Synod in the presence of other clergy. After a 5-year bishopric, Sadananda vacated the Cathedra on attaining superannuation resulting in sede vacante which was filled with the consecration of Mohan Manoraj.

Honorary commitments

Senate
Since 1993, Sadananda has been a Senator of the Senate of Serampore College (University) right until 2010, a record 18-year period during which he was involved in academic commitments within the University. He held many responsibilities at the University, especially during the Registrarship of D. S. Satyaranjan which later continued with successive Registrars who were at the helm,
 1993-2010, Senator, Senate of Serampore College (University),
 1994-2005, Secretary, Board of Theological Education of the Senate of Serampore College,
 2005-2010, President, Board of Theological Education of the Senate of Serampore College,
 2005-2010, President, Senate of Serampore College (University),

Other institutions
Sadananda also served in other ecclesiastical institutions,
 Ecumenical Christian Centre, Bangalore, as Chairperson from 2005 through 2009,
 Inter-Church Service Association, Chennai, as Chairperson,

Writings
 1974, A Comparative Study of the Form and Content of the Book of Proverbs and of Sarvajna Vachanagalu,
 1983, Revelation in the Psalms,
 1985, The Concept of Partnership: A response to Rev. Robert Scheuermeier,
 1989, Theology by the People - An Old Testament Perspective,
 2001, Equipping the People of God,
 2006, Mission perspectives and Search for an Ecclesiology,
 2006, Peace and justice-commitment for Sahodaya and Sarvodaya,

Honours
In 2015, the Board of Theological Education of the Senate of Serampore College published a festschrift in honour of Sadananda edited by Wati Longchar and P. Mohan Larbeer with essays written by friends and colleagues of Sadananda.

References

Further reading
 
 

Christian clergy from Karnataka
Kannada people
21st-century Anglican bishops in India
Anglican bishops of Karnataka Southern
1949 births
Indian Christian theologians
Senate of Serampore College (University) alumni
University of Göttingen alumni
University of Mysore alumni
Indian biblical scholars
Old Testament scholars
Academic staff of the Senate of Serampore College (University)
Living people